The Immediate Geographic Region of Januária is one of the 7 immediate geographic regions in the Intermediate Geographic Region of Montes Claros, one of the 70 immediate geographic regions in the Brazilian state of Minas Gerais and one of the 509 of Brazil, created by the National Institute of Geography and Statistics (IBGE) in 2017.

Municipalities 
It comprises 8 municipalities.

 Bonito de Minas   
 Cônego Marinho    
 Itacarambi     
 Januária     
 Juvenília 
 Montalvânia   
 Pedras de Maria da Cruz    
 São João das Missões

References 

Geography of Minas Gerais